In 2010, the Campeonato Brasileiro Série B, the second level of the Brazilian League, was contested by 20 clubs from May 7 to November 27, 2010. The top four teams in the table, former Brazilian Série A champions Coritiba and Bahia alongside Figueirense and América (MG), were promoted to the Campeonato Brasileiro Série A to be contested in 2011, meanwhile the bottom four were relegated to Série C next season. Three former Brazilian champion played in this edition: Bahia and 2009 relegated Coritiba and Sport Recife. Playing for the first time were Guaratinguetá, which was promoted along with ASA de Arapiraca, Icasa and América Mineiro from the Série C. After spending a single season in Série A, Santo André returned to Série B along with Náutico.

Format
For the fifth consecutive season, the tournament was played in a double round-robin system. The team with most points has been declared champions. The top four clubs ascended to Série A, meanwhile the bottom four were relegated to Série C.

Team information

Standings

Results

Top goalscorers

References

Campeonato Brasileiro Série B seasons
2010 in Brazilian football leagues